Venus Isabelle Palermo (born 8 February 1997), better known as Venus Angelic, is a Swiss YouTuber who is known for her doll-like appearance. She became known as the "living doll" after her YouTube video "How to look like a doll" was popular in March 2012.

Career 
In 2013 someone used Palermo's name to release a pre-release cover version of the Icona Pop song, "I Love It", which reached #71 on the UK Singles Chart. Her mother filed complaint at iTunes, and the song was removed. However, it never became clear who had used Palermo's name.

Personal life 
In December 2014, Palermo started a romantic relationship with Japanese national Manaki Okada. They married in December 2015, and Palermo subsequently emigrated to Japan in February 2016.

In May 2016, Palermo travelled to the Republic of Korea, where she underwent weight loss surgery, despite only weighing  at the time of the procedure. Palermo claims she contacted over 50 doctors around the world until she found one willing to proceed with the surgery. After the surgery, she was left with injuries in the stomach and was admitted to hospital, being treated with stomach medication and an IV drip.

References 

Video bloggers
Women video bloggers
1997 births
Living people
Cover artists
Swiss expatriates in Japan
Swiss bloggers
Swiss women bloggers